The Jahwist, or Yahwist, often abbreviated J, is one of the most widely recognized sources of the Pentateuch (Torah), together with the Deuteronomist, the Priestly source and the Elohist. The existence of the Jahwist is somewhat controversial, with a number of scholars, especially in Europe, denying that it ever existed as a coherent independent document. Nevertheless, many scholars do assume its existence. The Jahwist is so named because of its characteristic use of the term Yahweh (German: Jahwe;) for God.

Background
Modern scholars agree that separate sources underlie the Pentateuch, but there is much disagreement on how these sources were used by the authors to write the first five books of the Bible. The explanation called the documentary hypothesis dominated much of the 20th century, but the consensus surrounding this hypothesis has now broken down. Its critics suggest that contemporary upholders tend to give a much larger role to the redactors, who are now seen as adding much material of their own rather than as simply passive combiners of documents. 

The simple form of the documentary hypothesis has come under criticism from within its own constituents as well. The most notable revision in recent decades has been to suggest that the individual E and J documents are irrecoverable altogether, major parts of them having been scrapped by the first JE redactor; or that the E document was never independent at all, but rather is a part of the J document.

Characteristics
In J, Yahweh is an anthropomorphic figure both physically and mentally (such as when Abraham bargains with Yahweh for the fate of Sodom and Gomorrah, or when, during the exodus, Yahweh, incensed by the Israelites' lack of faith, threatens to destroy them all and raise Moses' descendants instead but "relented and did not bring on his people the disaster he had threatened" when dissuaded by Moses).

J has a particular fascination for traditions concerning Judah, including its relationship with its rival and neighbor, Edom; its focus on Judahite cities such as Jerusalem; and its support of the legitimacy of the Davidic monarchy. J is also critical of the other tribes of Israel, for example, by suggesting that the Northern Kingdom's capital of Shechem was captured via a massacre of the original inhabitants.

Michael D. Coogan suggests three recurring themes in the Jahwist tradition: the relationship between humans and soil, separation between humans and God, and progressive human corruption:

Relationship between humans and soil

J is unique in emphasizing a close relationship between humans and soil. This motif is first found in  when "the first human is called Adam because he is taken from the soil [Adamah in Hebrew]." Initially, man lives in harmony with the soil. After man eats from the tree of the knowledge of good and evil, however, the relationship is marred. In  Yahweh God curses the soil and man will toil in order to eat from it. The motif is furthered in the story of Cain and Abel. Cain is a tiller of the soil (Adamah), and after the murder, Cain is cursed from the ground . The bond between man and the soil is, seemingly, restored with Noah. He is described as a man of the soil and is described as the one who will bring relief from the toil of agriculture . Noah's drunkenness also alludes to the link between humans and the soil or plant/food the soil produces and corruption. In the end, J repeatedly shows a connection between human corruption and the soil.

The separation between the divine and human

One of the recurring themes of J in Genesis is the boundary between the divine and human realms. In , by eating the forbidden fruit, man and woman become like gods and are banished from the Garden of Eden, preventing them from retaining their immortality and full divinity.

Progressive human corruption

A third theme in the Jahwist is the increase of human corruption. God creates a world that is "very good", one in which all creatures are vegetarian and violence is unknown, but Eve's disobedience is followed by Cain's murder of his brother Abel, until Yahweh sees that the whole Earth is filled with corruption and resolves to destroy it with the Flood. Corruption does not cease after the Flood, but God accepts that his creation is flawed.

Date
Julius Wellhausen, the 19th century German scholar responsible for the classical form of the documentary hypothesis, did not attempt to date J more precisely than the monarchical period of Israel's history. In 1938, Gerhard von Rad placed J at the court of Solomon, c. 950 BCE, and argued that his purpose in writing was to provide a theological justification for the unified state created by Solomon's father, David. This was generally accepted until a crucial 1976 study by H. H. Schmid, Der sogenannte Jahwist ("The So-called Yahwist"), argued that J knew the prophetic books of the 8th and 7th centuries BCE, while the prophets did not know the traditions of the Torah, meaning J could not be earlier than the 7th century. A minority of scholars place J even later, in the exilic and/or post-exilic period (6th–5th centuries BCE).

Scope
The following is a record of the stories in the Bible that are generally accepted by the wider academic community as having been written by the J source:

Genesis
These chapters make up the so-called Primeval History, the story of mankind prior to Abraham, and J and P provide roughly equal amounts of material. The Jahwist provides the bulk of the remainder of Genesis, the material concerning Abraham, Isaac, Jacob and Joseph.  

Those following the classical documentary hypothesis today describe the J text spanning Genesis 2:4 to Genesis 35 with the end of the renaming of Jacob as Israel and the completion of the patriarchs of the twelve tribes.  The Joseph narrative seems to be an addition from a northern "E" narrative due to the more ethereal, pro-active, and prophetic nature of God compared to the reactive and anthropomorphic God of the J text. The latest additions of the P text frame the J narratives.  P text "glue" can be perceived in Genesis 1 (framing the book), Genesis 5 recounts Genesis 1 and provides a characteristic priestly lineage detail for Adam and, amongst other locations, Genesis 35, bridging the J text patriarchal narratives to the "E" Joseph narrative with more lineage details assumed important to post-exilic authors for the purpose of rebuilding the nation in the second temple period.

Exodus

Scholars argue regarding how much of Exodus is attributable to J and how much to E, as beginning in  the E source also refers to God as Yahweh.

After leaving Egypt, J gives its own account of releasing water from a rock and God raining Manna upon the Israelites. Thereafter, there is almost no J material in Exodus, except J's account of the Ten Commandments, also known as the Ritual Decalogue. J is generally not focused on law.

Leviticus

The vast majority of scholars attribute almost the entirety of Leviticus to P.

Numbers

J resumes at chapter 16, the story of the rebellion of Dathan and Abiram, which was spliced together with the account of Korah's rebellion from P by the Redactor. It is generally also believed that J provides large portions of chapters 21 to 24, covering the story of the bronze serpent, Balaam and his talking ass (although Friedman attributes this to E), and finally ending with the first verses of the Heresy of Baal Peor.

Deuteronomy 

The majority of Deuteronomy was composed during the era of Josiah's reforms by the Deuteronomist, or D, writer. However, when Deuteronomy was incorporated into the completed Pentateuch by the Redactor, the events of Moses's death were moved from the end of Numbers to Deuteronomy. Thus, one of the accounts of Moses's death in Deuteronomy is attributable to J, although scholars debate which verses this includes.

See also
 Elohist
 Deuteronomist
 Priestly Source
 The Book of J

Notes

References

External links 
The Jahwist source isolated, at wikiversity

Documentary hypothesis
Yahweh